Tual is the capital of the Maluku Tenggara regency, Indonesia. 

Tual may also refer to:

 Tual, Paglat, Maguindanao, Philippines
 Tual, Picong, Lanao del Sur, Philippines
 Tual, President Quirino, Sultan Kudarat, Philippines
 An alternative name for Saint Tudwal (died c. 564)
 Gabriel Tual (born 1998), French middle-distance runner
 Roland Tual (1902–1956), French director and producer

See also
 Taula (disambiguation)
 Tuala (disambiguation)